= 1950s–1960s North American drought =

Natural disaster in the United States

Droughts in the 1950s began in Southwest states in the United States, including Central California, Nevada, Arizona, New Mexico and the Western Texas areas. Beginning in 1954 the droughts spread to the Rocky Mountain areas, Great Plains, Upland South regions and Midwestern United States. The 1950s droughts were extremely and especially widespread in the Central United States, the Great Lakes area and Middle Atlantic region (i.e. from Virginia to Pennsylvania, New Jersey and southeast New York State) during 1954. The dry conditions, however, began subsiding in 1958 and 1959. The driest years during this decade were in 1954 and 1956.

== The 1960s droughts ==
The 1960s saw conditions of drought similar to the 1950s: In 1962, dry spells affected New England. That included Connecticut, Rhode Island and Massachusetts. The 1960s droughts also affected States from New York to Pennsylvania, Ohio and Indiana in these years. Parts of Great Plains or other Midwestern States were also hit by dry conditions during this decade. The Eastern United States were especially affected from 1962 to 1966.
